Abdulah Ibraković (born 22 July 1970) is a Bosnian professional football manager and former player.

Club career
Born in the town of Doboj, SR Bosnia-Herzegovina, SFR Yugoslavia, Ibraković began his career playing in the local club Sloga Doboj, competing back then in the Yugoslav Second League.

In his career as a player, a part from Bosnia, he also played in Germany, Austria and Croatia.

International career
Ibraković was a member of the Bosnia and Herzegovina national team from 1996 to 1999.

Managerial career
After retiring from playing, Ibraković began his managerial career. Initially, he managed Radnički Lukavac at the beginning of 2000, afterwards he worked at many clubs.

His biggest achievements so far are participating in the UEFA Intertoto Cup with Sloboda Tuzla, the Bosnian Cup final with Čelik Zenica in the 2010–11 season.

In the season 2013–14 he was named sporting director of Sarajevo. In his nearly 3 years of work at the club, Sarajevo won the cup title in the 2013–14 season, the Bosnian Premier League in the 2014–15 season and were also in the play-offs of the 2014–15 UEFA Europa League season.

After leaving Sarajevo, Ibraković managed Austrian club Kapfenberger SV from 2016 to 2017.

When it comes to international level, from 2002 to 2006, he was the coach of the Amateur Team of Bosnia and Herzegovina, then from 2006 to 2008, the head scout of the "A" national team of Bosnia and Herzegovina, and from 2008 to 2011, U21 national team assistant coach.

At his scholarship he had internships with Klaus Toppmöller, Ivan Ristić, Georg Zellhofer, Christoph Daum and Roberto Mancini.

Since October 2019, he has been the manager of Saudi Arabian MS League club Hetten.

On 13 July 2020, he returned to Kapfenberg.

Honours

Manager
Čelik Zenica
Bosnian Cup runner-up: 2010–11

Individual
Bosnian Premier League Manager of the Year: 2009

Other honours
Best sport result of the Football Association of Bosnia and Herzegovina: 2009
Author of the Book - Modern attacking Football - 2011
He as a Master of science at the University of Sarajevo in sports management - 2013
UEFA Pro Licence: 2006

References

External links
Abdulah Ibraković at Soccerway

1970 births
Living people
People from Doboj
Bosniaks of Bosnia and Herzegovina
Association football forwards
Bosnia and Herzegovina footballers
FK Sloga Doboj players
FK Radnički Lukavac players
OFK Gradina players
NK Osijek players
Bosnia and Herzegovina expatriate footballers
Expatriate footballers in Austria
Bosnia and Herzegovina expatriate sportspeople in Austria
Expatriate footballers in Germany
Bosnia and Herzegovina expatriate sportspeople in Germany
Expatriate footballers in Croatia
Bosnia and Herzegovina expatriate sportspeople in Croatia
Bosnia and Herzegovina football managers
FK Radnički Lukavac managers
FK Sloboda Tuzla managers
NK Bratstvo Gračanica managers
NK TOŠK Tešanj managers
FK Velež Mostar managers 
NK Čelik Zenica managers
Kapfenberger SV managers
Premier League of Bosnia and Herzegovina managers
Bosnia and Herzegovina expatriate football managers
Expatriate football managers in Austria
Expatriate football managers in Saudi Arabia
Bosnia and Herzegovina expatriate sportspeople in Saudi Arabia